Max and Moritz is a 1956 German musical film directed by Norbert Schultze. It stars Kristian Schultze and Norbert Schultze junior as the title characters. The film premiered on 28 September 1956 at Uhlenhorst Lichtspiele in Hamburg.

Plot 
A poet and a woman tell the story of the rascals Max and Moritz. The film is largely based on the original story Max and Moritz by humorist Wilhelm Busch.

Cast 
 Kristian Schultze – Moritz
 Norbert Schultze junior – Max
 Harry Wüstenhagen – The Poet
 Edith Elsholtz – The Woman
 Erika Nymgau-Odemar – The Widow
 Günther E. Bein – The Tailor
 Walther Diehl – The Teacher
 Gregor F. Ehlers – The Uncle
 Wulf Rittscher – The Baker
 Rolf Menke – The Farmer
 Wolfgang Erich Parge – The Miller

References

External links 
 

1956 films
1956 musical films
German musical films
West German films
German children's films
Films based on German comics
Live-action films based on comics
Films about children
Films set in the 19th century
1950s German films
1950s German-language films